The 2019 Nigerian Senate election in Zamfara State was held on February 23, 2019, to elect members of the Nigerian Senate to represent Zamfara State. Abdul'aziz Abubakar Yari representing Zamfara West, Aliyu Ikra Bilbis representing Zamfara Central and Tijjani Yahaya Kaura representing Zamfara North all won on the platform of All Progressives Congress. But the Supreme Court of Nigeria on 24 May 2019 sacked all the candidates of the All Progressives Congress that won elections in Zamfara State and said that candidates of parties with the highest number of valid votes cast with the required spread stands elected. Lawali Hassan Anka representing Zamfara West, Hassan Muhammed Gusau representing Zamfara Central and Sahabi Alhaji Yaú representing Zamfara North all on the platform of Peoples Democratic Party replaced the sacked senators.

Overview

Summary

Results

Zamfara West 
A total of 23 candidates registered with the Independent National Electoral Commission to contest in the election. APC candidate Abdul'aziz Abubakar Yari won the election, defeating PDP Lawali Hassan Anka and 21 other party candidates. But the Supreme Court of Nigeria sacked the APC candidate and replaced him with the PDP candidate as the rightful winner.

Zamfara Central 
A total of 29 candidates registered with the Independent National Electoral Commission to contest in the election. APC candidate Ikra Aliyu Bilbis won the election, defeating PDP Hassan Muhammed Gusau and 27 other party candidates. But the Supreme Court of Nigeria sacked the APC candidate and replaced him with the PDP candidate as the rightful winner.

Zamfara North 
A total of 22 candidates registered with the Independent National Electoral Commission to contest in the election. APC candidate Tijjani Yahaya Kaura won the election, defeating PDP Sahabi Alhaji Yaú and 20 other party candidates. But the Supreme Court of Nigeria sacked the APC candidate and replaced him with the PDP candidate as the rightful winner.

References 

Zamfara State senatorial elections